is one of the Gotō Islands in Japan. The island is part of the city of Gotō in the Nagasaki Prefecture.

References

islands of Nagasaki Prefecture